Franklin Township is one of the sixteen townships of Wayne County, Ohio, United States.  The 2000 census found 3,485 people in the township.

Geography
Located in the southern part of the county, it borders the following townships:
Wooster Township - north
East Union Township - northeast
Salt Creek Township - east
Salt Creek Township, Holmes County - southeast corner
Prairie Township, Holmes County - south
Ripley Township, Holmes County - southwest corner
Clinton Township - west
Plain Township - northwest corner

No municipalities are located in Franklin Township.

Name and history
It is one of twenty-one Franklin Townships statewide.

Government
The township is governed by a three-member board of trustees, who are elected in November of odd-numbered years to a four-year term beginning on the following January 1. Two are elected in the year after the presidential election and one is elected in the year before it. There is also an elected township fiscal officer, who serves a four-year term beginning on April 1 of the year after the election, which is held in November of the year before the presidential election. Vacancies in the fiscal officership or on the board of trustees are filled by the remaining trustees.

References

External links
Wayne County township map
County website

Townships in Wayne County, Ohio
Townships in Ohio